Mufti Muhammad Abbas (12 September 1921 - 4 August 2012) was a Pakistani bureaucrat from the Khyber Pakhtunkhwa province of Pakistan. He served as the 17th Caretaker Chief Minister of the Khyber Pakhtunkhwa from 19 July 1993 to 19 October 1993.

References

External links
 Khyber-Pakhtunkhwa provincial government

Chief Ministers of Khyber Pakhtunkhwa
1923 births
2017 deaths